Prince Pyotr Dmitriyevich Dolgorukov (1866, Tsarskoye Selo – 1951. Vladimir) was Russian liberal politician.

Life
Graduate of Moscow University. Well-known zemstvo man and for many years chairman of Sudzha Zemstvo Board. For his radical pronouncements at the sessions of Sudzha Uezd Committee to Study the Needs of Agricultural Industry, he was removed from his post by Plehve but reinstated under Sviatopolk-Mirsky.

He was one of the founders of the Union of Liberation and of the periodical publication Osvobozhdenie. He participated in zemstvo congresses, 1904–1905. One of the founders of the Constitutional Democratic Party, member and vice-chairman of the First State Duma, 1906. He was convicted by the court and imprisoned for three months for signing the Vyborg Appeal.

In 1909 he was reelected chairman of Sudzhensky Uyezd Zemstvo Board. He married and returned home, where he lived with his family (children Mikhail and Natalia) until the revolution.

After the 1917 revolution the family moved to Kaukas, 1919 to Crimea, in 1920 they emigrated from Russia to Istanbul, since 1922 they lived in Prague, where Pyotr Dmitriyevich between 1927-1941 lead Russian emigre organizations in Czechoslovakia. His twin brother Pavel Dolgorukov was executed by bolsheviks in 1927.

On the 9th of June 1945 he was in Prague arrested by SMERSH, convicted for anti-Soviet activities and taken to the Soviet Union. He spent last years of his life in Soviet prisons. He died in 1951. The date and place is unclear, maybe Butyrska prison.

He was the Great Uncle of Norwegian singer Georg Kajanus of pop band Sailor.

References
V.I. Gurko. Features And Figures Of The Past. Government And Opinion In The Reign Of Nicholas II.
Anastazie Kopřivová: КНЯЖЕСКИЙ РОД ДОЛГОРУКОВЫХ, К 150-летию со дня рождения П. Д. Долгорукова, in: Журнал Русская традиция, 26 октября 2016; online

Bibliography
 

1866 births
1951 deaths
People from Pushkin, Saint Petersburg
People from Tsarskoselsky Uyezd
Pyotr Dmitriyevich
Russian princes
Russian Constitutional Democratic Party members
Members of the 1st State Duma of the Russian Empire
Moscow State University alumni
White Russian emigrants to Czechoslovakia